Agnes Hijman (born 17 January 1966) is a long-distance runner from The Netherlands, who won the Eindhoven Marathon on 8 October 2006, clocking a total time of 2:54:36. She lives in Mijdrecht, and previously won the title in the Amsterdam Marathon, on 24 September 1995 in 2:48:57.

Achievements

References

Werkgroep Statistiek KNAU (1995 t/m 2000) Statistische jaarboeken 94 t/m 99 KNAU

1966 births
Living people
Dutch female long-distance runners
Dutch female marathon runners
People from De Ronde Venen
Place of birth missing (living people)
20th-century Dutch women
21st-century Dutch women
Sportspeople from Utrecht (province)